Neptis harita, the Indian dingiest sailer, is a species of nymphalid butterfly found in north-eastern India, Peninsular Malaysia, northern Indochina, southern Yunnan and Sumatra. The species was first described by Frederic Moore in 1875.

References

harita
Butterflies of Asia
Butterflies of Singapore
Butterflies of Indochina
Butterflies described in 1875